Mohit Ahlawat (born 25 December 1995) is an Indian cricketer who plays for Services. On 7 February 2017, Ahlawat became the first player to score a triple century in a twenty-overs match: he made 300 runs in 72 balls in a local T20 match.

He made his Twenty20 debut for Services in the 2018–19 Syed Mushtaq Ali Trophy on 21 February 2019. He made his List A debut on 27 September 2019, for Services in the 2019–20 Vijay Hazare Trophy.

References

External links
 

1995 births
Living people
Indian cricketers
Delhi cricketers
Services cricketers
Cricketers from Delhi